Geogepa striatula is a moth of the family Tortricidae. It is found in Vietnam.

The wingspan is 23 mm. The ground colour of the forewings is cinnamon cream, suffused and strigulated (finely streaked) with brownish cinnamon and with brown along the basal part of the costa. The hindwings are brownish grey, but creamier towards the base with brownish grey strigulation.

Etymology
The name is derived from Latin stria (meaning strigula) and refers to the fine brown streaks of the forewing.

References

Moths described in 2008
Archipini
Moths of Asia
Taxa named by Józef Razowski